Negro Lake is a lake located southwest of Partlow, New York. The outlet of the lake flows through an unnamed creek into Witchhopple Lake. Fish species present in Negro Lake are brook trout, white sucker, sunfish, yellow perch, and lake trout. Access by hiking Bushwhack Trail, located on northwest shore of Witchhopple Lake. No motors are allowed on Negro Lake.

References 

Lakes of Hamilton County, New York